Georgi Arnaudov (born 31 May 1974) is a former Bulgarian professional footballer who played as a goalkeeper.

External links
 footmercato profile

1974 births
Living people
Bulgarian footballers
First Professional Football League (Bulgaria) players
Association football goalkeepers
PFC Spartak Varna players